Derevnya Samarskogo otdeleniya sovkhoza (Sovxozdıñ Hamar büleksähe) is a rural locality (a village) in Krasnobashkirsky Selsoviet, Abzelilovsky District, Bashkortostan, Russia. The population was 510 as of 2010. There are 6 streets.

Geography 
The village is located 40 km northeast of Askarovo (the district's administrative centre) by road. Ozyornoye is the nearest rural locality.

References 

Rural localities in Abzelilovsky District